Cissura is a genus of moths in the family Erebidae. The genus was erected by Francis Walker in 1854.

Species
Cissura bilineata
Cissura decora
Cissura plumbea
Cissura unilineata

References

External links

Phaegopterina
Moth genera